Solidago virgaurea, the European goldenrod or woundwort, is an herbaceous perennial plant of the family Asteraceae. It is widespread across most of Europe as well as North Africa and northern, central, and southwestern Asia (China, Russia, India, Turkey, Kazakhstan, etc.). It is grown as a garden flower with many different cultivars. It flowers profusely in late summer.

Solidago virgaurea is a perennial herb up to 100 cm (40 inches) tall, with a branching underground caudex and a woody rhizome. It produces arrays of numerous small yellow flower heads at the top of the stem.

Subspecies and varieties
Solidago virgaurea subsp. alpestris (Waldst. & Kit.) Gremli
Solidago virgaurea subsp. armena (Grossh.) Greuter
Solidago virgaurea subsp. asiatica Kitam. ex Hara
Solidago virgaurea var. calcicola Fernald
Solidago virgaurea subsp. caucasica (Kem.-Nath.) Greuter 
Solidago virgaurea subsp. dahurica (Kitag.) Kitag.
Solidago virgaurea subsp. gigantea (Nakai) Kitam.
Solidago virgaurea var. insularis (Kitam.) Hara 
Solidago virgaurea subsp. jailarum (Juz.) Tzvelev
Solidago virgaurea subsp. lapponica (With.) Tzvelev
Solidago virgaurea subsp. macrorrhiza (Lange) Nyman 
Solidago virgaurea subsp. minuta (L.) Arcang.
Solidago virgaurea subsp. stenophylla (G.E.Schultz) Tzvelev
Solidago virgaurea subsp. talyschensis (Tzvelev) Sennikov 
Solidago virgaurea subsp. taurica (Juz.) Tzvelev 
Solidago virgaurea subsp. turfosa (Woronow ex Grossh.) Greuter
Solidago virgaurea subsp. virgaurea
Solidago virgaurea var. virgaurea

Medicinal uses
In the fifteenth and sixteenth centuries Solidago virgaurea was used in Europe to heal wounds. Its astringent, diuretic, antiseptic and other properties are well known. In various assessments by the European Medicines Agency with respect to Solidago virgaurea, non-clinical data shows diuretic, anti-inflammatory, antioxidant, analgesic and spasmolytic, antibacterial, and immunomodulatory activity. However, as no single ingredient is responsible for these effects, the whole herbal preparation of Solidago inflorescences must be considered as the active ingredient. Further, the relevance of those effects found in vitro could not be confirmed by clinical studies.

References

External links

Flora of North Africa
Flora of Asia
Flora of Europe
Plants described in 1753
virgaurea
Taxa named by Carl Linnaeus